A one-hit wonder is a musical artist known for only one hit single.

One Hit Wonder or One-Hit Wonder may also refer to:

 One Hit Wonder (band), a Californian punk band
 "One Hit Wonder" (CSI), an episode of CSI: Crime Scene Investigation
 "One Hit Wonder", a 1996 song by Tracy Bonham from The Burdens of Being Upright
 "One Hit Wonder", a 1997 song by Everclear from So Much for the Afterglow
 "One-Hit Wonder", a 2016 B-side song by the Pet Shop Boys from The Pop Kids
 One Hit Wonder, a 2001 novel by Lisa Jewell
 One-Hit Wonders (American TV series)
 One Hit Wonders (Canadian TV series), a Canadian music video program

See also
 One Hit Wonderland, a book by Tony Hawks